Tomáš Slovák (born 9 December 1979) is a Czech male canoeist who won 14 medals at senior level at the Wildwater Canoeing World Championships.

Medals at the World Championships
Senior

References

External links
 

1979 births
Living people
Czech male canoeists
Sportspeople from Opava